The  was the fifth annual professional wrestling single-elimination tournament promoted by World Wonder Ring Stardom in Tokyo, Japan. The event took place on April 29, 2019.

Storylines
The show featured fourteen Cinderella Tournament  matches and a dark match with scripted storylines, where wrestlers portray villains, heroes, or less distinguishable characters in the scripted events that built tension and culminate in a wrestling match or series of matches. The matches can be won by pinfall, submission or elimination over the top rope. A time-limit draw or a double elimination means a loss for each competitor.

Event
The preshow included a dark match in which Hanan and Saya Iida defeated Hina and Leo Onozaki, and Rina and Ruaka in a three-way tag team match. The Cinderella Tournament had one draw between Kagetsu and Nakano who went into the 10-minute time limit which handed Arisa Hoshiki a walkover victory straight to the semi-finals. Hoshiki succeeded in winning the tournament with her granted wish being a match for the Wonder of Stardom Championship against the then-time champion Momo Watanabe. Hoshiki won the "white belt" at Stardom Gold 2019 on May 16.

Participants
The tournament was composed by 16 competitors including the champions. It was the last event to conclude in a single day.

*Noted underneath were the champions who held their titles at the time of the tournament.
{| class="wikitable sortable" align="left center" 
|-
!Wrestler
!Unit
!Notes
|-
|Andras Miyagi
|Oedo Tai
|
|-style="background: gold"
|Arisa Hoshiki
|Stars
|Winner
|-
|AZM
|Queen's Quest
|
|-
|Bea Priestley
|Queen's Quest
|
|-
|Hana Kimura
|Tokyo Cyber Squad
|
|-
|HZK
|Oedo Tai
|High Speed Champion
|-
|Jungle Kyona
|Tokyo Cyber Squad
|
|-
|Kagetsu
|Oedo Tai
|World of Stardom Champion
|-
|Konami
|Tokyo Cyber Squad
|
|-
|Momo Watanabe
|Queen's Quest
|Goddess of Stardom ChampionWonder of Stardom Champion
|-
|Natsu Sumire
|Oedo Tai
|
|-
|Natsuko Tora
|Oedo Tai
|
|-
|Rebel Kel
|Tokyo Cyber Squad
|
|-
|Saki Kashima
|Stars
|Artist of Stardom Champion
|-
|Starlight Kid
|Stars
|
|-
|Tam Nakano
|Stars
|Artist of Stardom Champion
|-

Brackets

Notes

References

External links
Page Stardom World

2019 in professional wrestling
2019 in Tokyo
Women's professional wrestling shows
World Wonder Ring Stardom shows
World Wonder Ring Stardom
Professional wrestling in Tokyo